Newspaper Row in San Francisco referred to the five-point intersection of Market Street, Kearny Street, Third Street and Geary Street, where three of San Francisco's largest daily newspapers were headquartered, across the street from each other. By 1902, The San Francisco Call, The San Francisco Examiner and the San Francisco Chronicle were in buildings on corners, with the Chronicle in the Chronicle Building, the Call in the Spreckels Building and the Examiner in the Examiner building. The intersection became known as the "Times Square of the West".

History
Newspaper Row began when the Chronicle Building, the first steel-framed building the Western United States, was constructed. It was the tallest building in San Francisco upon completion in 1889. William Randolph Hearst, the owner of The San Francisco Examiner, purchased a nearby lot, where he intended to build a taller building. In 1895, Claus Spreckels began construction of the Spreckels Building for The San Francisco Call, and the five-point intersection of Market Street, Kearny Street, Third Street and Geary Street was set as the center of news in the city.

Newspaper Row was partially destroyed in the 1906 San Francisco Fire. The Calls Spreckels building and the Examiners Hearst building were slowly gutted over two hours, and the Chronicles building was similarly gutted, but the brick remained and was rebuilt. The three newspapers published a combined issue from the office of the Oakland Tribune.

Relocation 
The two surviving papers later relocated to near the intersection of Fifth Street and Mission Street, The San Francisco Examiner (Fifth) and the San Francisco Chronicle (Mission) across from the San Francisco Mint.

References

Newspaper row
San Francisco